John Hall Fulton (1792 – January 28, 1836) was a nineteenth-century politician and lawyer from Virginia. He was the brother of Andrew S. Fulton.

Biography
Born in Augusta County, Virginia, Fulton attended common schools as a child and went on to graduate from Hampden-Sydney College. He studied law and was admitted to the bar, commencing practice in Abingdon, Virginia. He was a member of the Virginia House of Delegates in 1823 and 1824 and the Virginia Senate from 1829 to 1831. Fulton was elected a Jacksonian to the United States House of Representatives in 1832, serving from 1833 to 1835, being unsuccessful for reelection in 1834. He ran for the House again in 1836, but died before the election on January 28, 1836, in Abingdon, Virginia. He was interred in Sinking Spring Cemetery in Abingdon.

External links

1792 births
1836 deaths
Members of the Virginia House of Delegates
Virginia state senators
Members of the United States House of Representatives from Virginia
Virginia lawyers
Politicians from Abingdon, Virginia
Virginia Jacksonians
19th-century American politicians
19th-century American lawyers
People from Augusta County, Virginia